Fenleuton (trade name Lofrin) is a drug that acts as a 5-lipoxygenase inhibitor and inhibits leukotriene (LTB4, LTC4, LTD4, and LTE4) formation. It has been studied for potential use in veterinary medicine to treat respiratory diseases such as chronic obstructive pulmonary disease (COPD) in horses.

References

Ureas
Phenyl compounds
Alkyne derivatives
Leukotriene pathway inhibitors